Robert Giles Motzko (born March 27, 1961) is the head coach of the University of Minnesota men's hockey team in Minneapolis, Minnesota, where he had previously served as Assistant Coach in 2001–05. He was previously the head coach of the St. Cloud State Huskies from 2005 to 2018. During his time at SCSU, he was named the WCHA Coach of the Year in 2006 and again in 2007.  In 2014 he was named the inaugural NCHC Herb Brooks Coach of the Year. In 2018 he won the Herb Brooks Coach of the Year for the second time. He guided the Huskies to six WCHA Final Five appearances (2006, 2007, 2008, 2010, 2012 and 2013), three NCHC Frozen Faceoff appearances (2015, 2016 and 2018), eight NCAA Division I tournament appearances (2007, 2008, 2010, 2013, 2014, 2015, 2016 and 2018), and one NCAA Division I Frozen Four appearance in 2013.

Playing career

Waterloo and Austin
Motzko played for the Waterloo Black Hawks and the Austin Mavericks in the 1979–1980 season. That year, he had 16 goals, 10 assists, and 19 penalty minutes.

Dubuque Fighting Saints
In the 1980–1981 season, Motzko played for the Dubuque Fighting Saints of the United States Hockey League where he had 20 goals and 16 assists. That year, he helped the Saints win the Anderson Cup and the Clark Cup.

St. Cloud State
Motzko played for St. Cloud State University (SCSU) from 1983–1987. He was a two-year varsity letter winner for the SCSU hockey team from 1984–86.

Coaching career

St. Cloud State
Motzko began his coaching career in 1986–87 as an assistant coach for the legendary Herb Brooks at SCSU – and also worked with former SCSU head coach Craig Dahl.

North Iowa
Motzko served as general manager and head coach of the USHL's North Iowa Huskies from 1987 through 1991. In 1989, Motzko led the North Iowa squad to a United States Junior A national championship and was named that year's USHL Coach of the Year.

Miami University and Denver
In 1991, Motzko was named associate head coach at Miami University in Oxford, Ohio, where he helped lead the RedHawks to a Central Collegiate Hockey Association title and an NCAA tournament berth in 1992–93. He served for one season as an associate head coach at the University of Denver from 1993–94, before returning to Miami University in 1994.

Sioux Falls Stampede
Motzko was named general manager and head coach of the USHL's Sioux Falls Stampede in 1998. He led the Stampede to a 77–31–6 record in the team's first two seasons in the USHL, and in 2000, he was named the USHL General Manager of the Year.

University of Minnesota
Motzko served as a men's hockey assistant coach at the University of Minnesota and was part of two NCAA Division I national championship teams in 2002 and 2003, and helped the Gophers win WCHA playoff crowns in 2003 and 2004.

Return to St. Cloud State 

Motzko became the head coach at his alma mater, St. Cloud State, in 2005. In 2013 his contract was extended through the 2020–2021 season.

On March 26, 2010, Motzko led the Huskies to their first NCAA Tournament win in the West Regional at Xcel Energy Center.  SCSU earned a 4–3 victory in double overtime against Northern Michigan University. The victory snapped an eight-game losing streak in the tournament for SCSU. St. Cloud fell in the West Regional Championship game to the University of Wisconsin the next night.

In the 2012–2013 season, Motzko led SCSU to a WCHA regular season championship, the Huskies' first regular season conference title. Though they secured the #1 seed, the Huskies shared the MacNaughton Cup with the University of Minnesota.  On March 30–31, 2013, Motzko led the Huskies to a pair of NCAA Tournament victories over Notre Dame (5–1) and Miami University (4–1) at Huntington Center (Toledo) to advance to the first Frozen Four in school history.  St. Cloud fell to Quinnipiac University in the Frozen Four on April 11, 2013, at Consol Energy Center.

In the 2013–14 season, Motzko led the Huskies to the inaugural NCHC regular season championship.  Unlike in the 2012–13 season, the Huskies held the Penrose Cup alone.  On March 29, 2014, Motzko led the Huskies to a win over Notre Dame (4–3 OT)in the NCAA tournament West Regional at Xcel Energy Center to advance to the Regional Championship for the second straight year, but fell to the University of Minnesota 4–0.

In the 2015–16 season, Motzko led the Huskies to a school record-tying 31 victories as well as the first NCHC conference tournament championship in school history, defeating the Duluth Bulldogs 3–1 in the Frozen Faceoff title game on March 19, 2016.  The victory also gave Motzko and the Huskies their fourth straight NCAA Tournament berth, also tying a school record; they would fall to Ferris State University (5–4 OT) in the NCAA West Regional at Xcel Energy Center.

In the 2017–2018 season, the Huskies won their second Penrose Cup as NCHC regular season champions. They also qualified for the national tournament as the overall #1 seed.

United States men's national junior ice hockey team
In 2017, Motzko becomes head coach of the US national junior ice hockey team. He led them to the United States fourth-ever gold medal in the IIHF World Junior Championships.

Return to Minnesota

On March 27, 2018, Motzko was named the 15th head coach of the University of Minnesota, following Don Lucia's resignation.

Head coaching record

College

Personal life
Motzko, a native of Austin, Minnesota, Bob and Shelley have had three children, a daughter, Ella, and two sons Mack and the youngest Beau. On July 24, 2021, Mack died at the age of 20 from injuries sustained in a single car accident in which he was a passenger in Orono, Minnesota. The family currently resides in Minnetonka, Minnesota.

References

1961 births
Place of birth missing (living people)
Living people
American ice hockey coaches
St. Cloud State Huskies men's ice hockey players
St. Cloud State Huskies men's ice hockey coaches
Miami RedHawks men's ice hockey coaches
Denver Pioneers men's ice hockey coaches
Minnesota Golden Gophers men's ice hockey coaches